The Magician's Apprentice is a 2007 fantasy novel by Trudi Canavan

The Magician's Apprentice may also refer to:

"The Magician's Apprentice" (Doctor Who), a 2015 episode
"The Sorcerer's Apprentice", 1797 poem by Johann Wolfgang von Goethe

See also 
Sorcerer's Apprentice (disambiguation)